Google Transliteration and Google Indic Transliteration is a transliteration typing service for languages with non-Latin Alphabets.

This tool first appeared in Blogger, Google's popular blogging service. Later on, it came into existence as a separate online tool. Its popularity got it embedded in GMail and Orkut. In December 2009, Google released its offline version named Google IME.

This tool from Google is based on dictionary based phonetic transliteration approach. In contrast to older Indic typing tools, which work by transliterating under a particular scheme, Google transliterates by matching the Latin alphabet words with an inbuilt dictionary. Since users do not need to remember the transliteration scheme, the service is so easy that it is suitable for total beginners.

For transliteration between scripts, there was, until July 2011, a separate service named Google Script Converter.

See also
 Google IME
 Microsoft Indic Language Input Tool
 Scientific transliteration of Cyrillic
 Azhagi (Software)

External links
Google Input Tools (Homepage)
Google Transliteration IME (Offline IME)
Google Transliteration - Firefox Addon 

transliteration
Indic computing
Urdu-language computing